The decade of the 1250s in art involved some significant events.

Works

 c.1250: The doorway from Moutiers-Saint-Jean is carved
 1250: The illuminated manuscript Morgan Bible is completed
 1251: Kei school sculptor produces Tamayori-bime statue in Yoshino Mikumari Shrine
 1251–1254: Tankei sculpts a Thousand-armed Kannon at Sanjūsangen-dō

Births
 1250: Giovanni Pisano, Italian sculptor, painter and architect (died 1315)
 1254
 Ren Renfa, Chinese painter of horses, people, flowers and birds (died 1327)
 Zhao Mengfu, Chinese scholar, painter and calligrapher during the Yuan Dynasty (died 1322)
 c.1255
 Duccio, Italian artist, influential in his time (died 1318/19)
 Filippo Rusuti, Italian painter and mosaicist (died 1325)
 1259: Pietro Cavallini, Italian painter and mosaic designer working during the late Middle Ages (died c.1330)

Deaths
 1256: Tankei, Japanese sculptor of the Kei school (born 1173)
 1258: Giunta Pisano, Italian painter (born 1180)

 
Years of the 13th century in art
Art